British Railways Mark 1 is the family designation for the first standardised designs of railway carriages built by British Railways (BR) from 1951 until 1974, now used only for charter services on the main lines or on preserved railways.

Following nationalisation in 1948, BR had continued to build carriages to the designs of the "Big Four" companies (the Great Western, Southern, London, Midland and Scottish and London and North Eastern railways), and the Mark 1 was intended to be the standard carriage design for use across all lines, incorporating the best features of each of the former companies' designs. It was also designed to be much stronger than previous designs, to provide better protection for passengers in the event of a collision or derailment.

The Mark 1 coaches were built in two distinct tranches: the early vehicles (1951–1960) and the 'Commonwealth' stock (named from the type of bogie used) from 1961 onwards.

Construction

The design was used for hauled passenger stock, multiple unit carriages and non-passenger carrying stock. For passenger stock, construction continued from 1951 to 1963, while multiple units and non-passenger carrying stock continued to be built until 1974. Developed by Derby Carriage & Wagon Works, they were built at Derby, Doncaster, Eastleigh, Swindon, Wolverton and York works.

These were constructed in two lengths. The shorter vehicles were intended for use where the track curvature was too tight to accommodate the longer vehicles, due to excessive overhang.

This provided reasonable space. Care was taken to ensure that passengers could enjoy an unobstructed view out of the train from all seats.

An unusual feature of the design was the bodyside tumblehome curvature, of  radius and just noticeable; the windows had flat glass and consequently the upper quarter was separate and in a different plane from the lower glazing, with an intervening transom, and the steel panels were recessed on either side of each window opening to accommodate the difference between the flat glass and the curved sides. The opening portion of the windows were provided with sliding ventilators, with an external aerofoil for draught-free ventilation, the correct opening position being marked by a pair of arrows. Doors were provided with frameless droplights manufactured by Beclawat; these were supported by a spring-loaded lazytongs mechanism inside the lower part of the door, and the top of the window had a sprung metal clip engaging in slots on either side of the window opening.

The original vehicles had timber veneer interior finishes, and on the main line vehicles small plastic labels were fixed to the panels, giving the type of wood and its country of origin e.g. "Crown Elm Great Britain"; "Lacewood Great Britain", etc. In 1955, an order was placed for 14 vehicles, with manufacturers being invited to incorporate innovative features; perhaps the most striking of these prototypes, which were completed in 1957, were those constructed by Cravens. Following evaluation, and with the increasing influence of the British Transport Design Panel, Mark 1 vehicles built from the later 1950s onwards were to modified designs. Laminates were used instead of timber panelling, and in the last of the Mark 1 hauled vehicles, fluorescent lighting was fitted instead of tungsten bulbs. An important variant on the Mark 1 design were the 44 Pullman vehicles built by Metro-Cammell in 1960. A further change introduced in the late 1950s was the use of aluminium window frames instead of direct glazing into the steel panelling.

The underframes consisted of a heavy assembly of steel sections, with angle used to form bracing trusses. These were placed close to the centre line of the vehicle rather than beneath the solebars, as was characteristic of previous vehicles. The original bogies were a double bolster type, which like the carriages mounted upon them, were designated "BR Mark 1" (BR1 for short). These proved unsatisfactory and a new cast-steel design was introduced from 1958 (often referred to as the Commonwealth type). This gave a superb ride with minimal tyre wear, but was heavy. The final batches of locomotive hauled Mark 1s, and many Mark 1 EMU vehicles, were built with the Swindon-designed B4 bogie. Later on, many BR1 bogie vehicles were retrofitted with the B4 bogie, and a comfortable ride could then be relied on, as was evident in the later EMU vehicles.

An important factor was the compressive coupling, which provided excellent inter-vehicular damping through the gangway end-plates, which quickly became highly polished, indicating that they were performing this task.

A device known as a tell-tale connects the emergency (communication) cord or chain to the train line to facilitate an emergency stop.

Sleeping cars 

British Railways and outside contractors built the British Railways Mark 1 sleeping car between 1957 and 1964.  Three hundred and eighty cars of three different types were built, with a fourth type created later by conversion. None remain in front-line service and very few are preserved (this was due to asbestos insulation in most carriages).

Three types were designed, based on the BR Mark 1  underframe and profile. All featured 11 compartments with side corridor, an attendants' pantry at one end, and two toilets at the other. There was one fixed berth in first class compartments and two fixed berths in second class. Thus the Sleeper First (SLF) slept 11 and the Sleeper Second (SLSTP) 22. The Sleeper Composite (SLC) had five first class and 6 second class compartments.

Early examples were fitted with BR1 bogies which were later replaced with B5 bogies. Later examples were fitted with Commonwealth bogies from new. The cars weighed 39 to 42 tonnes, with the First-class cars weighing one tonne less than the others, and cars with the fabricated B5 bogies also weighing one tonne less than those with the heavy cast steel Commonwealth bogies.

Modifications 
In order to overcome the lack of flexibility in the fleet of sleeping cars, Wolverton works modified some of the SLSTP cars with a stowable top berth. The resulting Sleeper Either class with Pantry (SLEP) cars could then be used to better accommodate the fluctuations in passenger demand. The SLEPs were renumbered in the 2800-series.

Replacement 
The Mark 1 sleeping cars fleet continued to serve British Rail for many years. With no Mark 2 sleeping car design, the Mark 1s continued until the British Rail Mark 3 sleeping cars entered service in the early 1980s.

1957 prototypes
In 1957 a dozen carriages were built: four by Doncaster Works and two each by four outside contractors, in an attempt to improve on the existing design. While the passenger comfort level may have improved, the passenger capacity fell (except for the two built by the Gloucester Railway Carriage and Wagon Company), resulting in a lower passenger per ton-of-train figure and disdain from BR's operating departments. Further orders to these designs were not forthcoming.

Fibreglass bodied vehicles
In 1962, Eastleigh Works constructed a single fibreglass bodied Mark 1. The vehicle, numbered S1000S, was mounted on the underframe of Mark 1 Tourist Second Open S4378, which was written off as a result of the Lewisham rail crash in 1957. Only the one example was built due to the cost, making this the only fibreglass-bodied passenger carriage built by British Railways. S1000S was used on the Hayling Island Branch Line until closure in 1963. After use as a generator van at Lancing Carriage Works, it re-entered capital stock. It was purchased in 1973 by the East Somerset Railway. Repainted into maroon when work carried out in 2016.

A single van, no. E85000, also had fibreglass body panels. This was converted from a normal passenger carriage (Mark 1 Corridor Composite no. Sc15170) at Derby Carriage & Wagon Works in 1970 to carry parcels conveyed in BRUTE trolleys; it was used until 1982.

XP64
Near the end of the production of hauled Mark 1 stock came a series of eight experimental carriages known as the XP64 set. Three Corridor Firsts, two Corridor Seconds, and three Tourist Second Opens were built by Derby Carriage & Wagon Works in 1964. Externally they resembled Mark 1 stock with the addition of a cosmetic cover over the solebars of the standard Mark 1 underframes, but inside they included many new features, including pressure ventilation, new seating designs and wider bi-fold doors. Many of these features were later incorporated in the Mark 2 stock produced from 1964.

Safety
The British Rail Mark 1 was considerably stronger than most pre-nationalisation designs, and it was noticed as early as 1952 that the examples involved in the Harrow and Wealdstone rail crash had withstood the impacts better than the older coaches around them.  The improvement in safety the Mark 1 thus represented was praised by the Chief Inspecting Officer of Railways, Lt Col I.K.A. McNaughton (Chief Inspecting Officer of Railways, Department for Transport), in the Sir Seymour Biscoe Tritton Lecture to the Institution of Mechanical Engineers in 1977. Speaking of the fall in fatalities since 1955, he put forward his opinion that a major factor in this improvement was "the introduction in 1951 of the BR standard Mark 1 passenger carriage, which, over a period of about ten years, replaced pre-war designed rolling stock on most principal routes. The damage-resistant qualities of this all-steel coach, mounted on a 200 ton end-load resistant underframe and fitted with buckeye couplings, have been evidenced time and time again. Only in a small number of very destructive accidents has serious body damage of the kind that inevitably leads to fatal accidents been observed and there have been several remarkable instances of high-speed derailments in which no personal injuries have occurred."  

Although construction of Mark 1 passenger stock ended in 1963, multiple units and non-passenger carrying stock based on the Mark 1 design continued to be built until 1974.  

The 1988 Clapham Junction rail accident highlighted that by the 1980s the Mark 1 coach was dated, and less able to withstand collisions than newer designs.  Nevertheless, the Hidden Report into the disaster concluded that withdrawal of Mark 1 units was impractical and the design was not inherently unsafe: "The inventory of Mark I coaching stock is large, and much of it has not reached an end of economic life, nor will do so for another decade or more. Mark I vehicles have good riding qualities, and are not intrinsically lacking in collision resistance." British Rail was still using some 4EPB and 2EPB (classes 415 and 416) multiple units with underframes that had been constructed before World War II and these were a priority for replacement.

During the late 1990s Mark 1 stock began to reach the end of its design life and concerns about its safety relative to newer rolling stock became more pressing. The Health and Safety Executive issued instructions in 1999 per the Railway Safety Regulations 1999 to withdraw all Mark 1 carriages and multiple units based on that design by the end of 2002 unless rebodied or modified to reduce the potential for overriding in the event of a collision. A proposed modification to extend mainline use beyond 2002 at the time of the 1999 HSE instruction was 'cup and cone', however trials were inconclusive and deemed expensive in comparison with the safety benefits. In October 2002 the Health and Safety Executive extended the permitted use of Mark 1 based rolling stock until 31 December 2004 with the proviso they be fitted with a Train Protection & Warning System.

Post-privatisation

During the 1990s, the few remaining Mark 1 loco-hauled vehicles on the main line were withdrawn, having been progressively replaced by Mark 2 and Mark 3 stock through the 1970s and 1980s. However, the extensive Network SouthEast commuter network on the former Southern Region operated by the Network SouthCentral, Network SouthEastern and South West Trains shadow franchises was worked mainly by Mark 1 based multiple units of the 205, 207, 411, 412, 421, 422 and 423 classes.

When British Rail was privatised in the mid-1990s, only Connex South Eastern was given an extended franchise (15 years) in return for ordering new trains. Connex South Central and South West Trains, the other major users of Mark 1 multiple units, were not required to order new trains. As a result, in 2000, Mark 1 units were still in use across most of the former Southern Region with no new trains having been ordered.

When the franchises were relet in the early 2000s, they were done with a requirement to replace the Mark 1s, thus hundreds of new multiple units of classes 171, 375, 376, 377, 444, 450 and 458 were introduced by Connex South Eastern, South West Trains and Southern between 2001 and 2005.

A similar story took place in Scotland, with the last of ScotRail's Mark 1 based Class 303 multiple units surviving until December 2002.

The use of Mark 1 stock on postal trains was curtailed when the Royal Mail partially replaced them in the early 1990s. The postal train services on the West Coast Main Line were worked using new Class 325 multiple units. However, these units proved to be extremely troublesome in service and due to technical failures were often loco-hauled instead of running under their own power , and therefore Mark 1 formations continued to be used here, and elsewhere on the network. However, in January 2004, the Royal Mail ceased using rail to transport mail traffic. Thus, the problem of how to replace the large numbers of Mark 1 carriages on these services was resolved.

Network Rail continue to use converted Mark 1 coaches for various departmental duties – test trains, sandite units, and accommodation units for worksite personnel are some examples.

A small number of railtour companies have waivers to operate Mark 1 carriage stock on railtour duties. The conditions usually involve the fitting of central door locking and having either a non-passenger or non-Mark 1 carriage at the ends of the train. This is often achieved by running with a locomotive at each end of the train, instead of just at the front, which also reduces the need to run-round at minor terminus stations, many of which lost their run-round facilities when locomotive hauled trains of Mark 1 or Mark 2 coaches gave way to multiple unit operation on service trains.

The final withdrawal of Mark 1s from daily mainline use in 2005, some 54 years since the design entered service. South West Trains was granted a derogation to continue to operating two three-car 421s on the Lymington branch line until 2010.

Due to the lack of central door locking and Mark 1 stock not meeting the latest rolling stock safety expectations, various rules now govern their usage. In particular vehicles lacking central door locking require a steward to be present in each vehicle. Train companies are also recommended to run Mark 1 stock with more robust non-Mark 1 stock at either end to act as a barrier in the case of collisions. Mark 1s continue to be used on special charter trains with charter operators including North Yorkshire Moors Railway, Riviera Trains, Vintage Trains and West Coast Railways. The Office of Rail & Road has granted these operators an exemption to the Railway Safety Regulations 1999 to continue to operate Mark 1s on the main line until 2023.

Preservation

Restored Mark 1 carriages have entered service on many of the UK's heritage railways. Their ready availability has avoided the need for the railways to rely on the limited quantity of surviving pre-BR carriage stock – most examples of which had been scrapped before the railway preservation movement had properly started.

The long service life of Mark 1 carriages means that a heritage railway can (potentially) recreate an authentic period train of the 1950s, 1960s, 1970s, 1980s or early 1990s, when painted in a suitable livery.

Sleeping cars 
Several Mark 1 sleeping cars were bought by preservation societies for use as volunteer accommodation. When British Rail began to run down its overnight sleeper trains, many heritage railways replaced them with 'young' Mark 3 cars. Since most Mark 1 sleeping cars had been built with asbestos insulation, which was expensive to have decontaminated professionally, most were sold for scrap.

Those Mark 1 sleeping cars that survive have been decontaminated and are kept for their value as museum exhibits, as much as for sleeping accommodation.

No Sleeper Either class with pantry (SLEP) has survived, 1 Sleeper Composite exists with 6 Sleeper Firsts and 1 Sleeper Second.

Liveries

British Railways Mark I carriages have been painted in a wide range of liveries. On introduction in 1951 the carriages were painted Crimson Lake (the official Railways Executive designation), usually referred to as Crimson (BS381C:540 Crimson being the British Standard colour reference) and Cream (the combination often referred to colloquially as "blood and custard") for corridor stock and Crimson for non-corridor stock. Corridor passenger stock was normally also lined out whereas non-corridor stock was not. The term 'Carmine' is often incorrectly used as a consequence of an error made by a contemporary railway journalist and has, unfortunately, been repeated ever since.

1956 saw the first big changes, with the end of 'third class' and the return of regional colour schemes. The Western Region promptly adopted Great Western Railway chocolate and cream livery for vehicles used on its named express trains and maroon for other stock. The Southern Region reverted to green and the other regions adopted maroon. 1962 saw Southern Region adopt the now familiar yellow cantrail above first class and red above dining cars. By the end of the 1960s this was found on all carriages. In 1962 the Western Region abandoned the use of chocolate and cream.

With the introduction of spray painting in 1964, the coach ends became the same colour as the bodywork. A year later the ubiquitous British Rail blue and grey was introduced with the Mark 2s, and by 1968 most non-suburban Mark I stock was blue and grey; however it wasn't until 1974 that the last maroon Mark 1 was repainted into blue and grey livery. The use of blue and grey continued until 1982 when the first experiments in new liveries occurred. During the BR blue period other changes took place - notably the last 'Ladies Only' compartments vanished in 1977.

1982 saw a proliferation of new liveries, including yellow and grey for stock that was requisitioned for engineering and maintenance work. In 1985 some carriages reappeared in chocolate and cream for the GWR 150th anniversary celebrations, along with a brief Scottish experiment in green and cream. Then around 1988 reclassification of 'second class' as 'standard class' took place.

1983 was the year that the InterCity livery was first seen, 1986 the introduction of Network SouthEast and the end of the Searail livery.

During the 1980s a complete rake of 1950s built corridor compartment second class Mark 1s (including a BSK) which operated exclusively on the Glasgow - Stranraer route and connected with the Irish Sea ferries, were painted into a very striking Sealink livery of red, blue, and white, and internally the vestibules (but not the main side corridors) were painted bright yellow to match the refurbished EMUs of the period. Being early 1950s coaches these had all-timber interiors which lent themselves to painting. Following withdrawal from the Stranraer line towards the end of the 1980s this rake was used by ScotRail on "Merrymaker" charter services, including long-distance trips on the West Coast Main Line, before eventually being withdrawn completely at the very end of the 1980s.

1988 saw the first Regional Railways livery (as well as postal trains and parcels trains turning Royal Mail red).

From 1995/96 private operators began to paint their stock their own colours.

See also 
 Mainline steam trains in Great Britain
 Rolling stock of the Watercress Line - User of Mark 1 coaches for preservation/heritage railway
 Taunton sleeping car fire

References 

G. M. Kichenside British Railways Coaches, Ian Allan ABC

Further reading

External links 

 BR MkI coaches at Southern Railway E-mail Group

Mark 1
Train-related introductions in 1951